Tigheci River is a tributary of the Prut river in Moldova. It flows near the village of Băiuş, and pours near the village of Stoianovca. The meadow flora is represented by 100 plant species of 27 families and 74 genres.

References

Rivers of Moldova
Tributaries of the Prut